Asterolepis chlorissa is a species of moth of the family Tortricidae. It is found in Indonesia (Moluccas).

References

Moths described in 1966
Tortricini
Moths of Indonesia
Taxa named by Józef Razowski